Myra is an ancient Lycian town in modern Turkey.

Myra may also refer to:

People
Myra (given name), a female given name in the English-speaking world
Myra (rapper), Norwegian rapper Regina Tucker (born 1994)
Myra (singer), Mexican American pop singer Mayra Ambriz (born 1986)

Places

United States
 Myra, Kentucky, an unincorporated community
 Myra Arboretum, Larimore, North Dakota
 Myra, Texas, an unincorporated community
 Myra, West Virginia, an unincorporated community
 Myra, Wisconsin, an unincorporated community

Other places
 Mount Myra, a mountain in British Columbia, Canada
 Myra, Norway, a village
 Myra Station, Norway, a former railway station

Other uses
 myRA (My Retirement Account), a type of Roth IRA account in the United States
 MYRA School of Business, a business school in Mysore, India
 Sara and Myra, Israeli offshore exploratory drilling licenses
 Myra (genus), a genus of crabs
 Myra (painting), a 1995 painting by Marcus Harvey
 Myra (album), rapper Myra's 2001 debut album

See also 
 Mira (disambiguation)
 Myra Falls (disambiguation)